Adam Paul Cunnington (born 7 October 1987) is an English footballer who plays as a striker for Isthmian Premier League club Enfield Town.

Career
Born in Leighton Buzzard, Bedfordshire, Cunnington started his career with Barton Rovers during the 2005–06 season, in which he scored three goals in 22 appearances. He started the 2006–07 season with five goals in 13 appearances for Barton, before moving to Leighton Town. After scoring three goals in 13 appearances for Leighton he finished the season with Hitchin Town. Having made three appearances for Hitchin in the 2007–08 season he signed for Aylesbury United in September 2007. After making four appearances for the club he returned to former club Barton Rovers, before going on to finish the season with Rothwell Town, making one appearance for the club. Cunnington started the 2008–09 season with Stamford, before joining Barwell later that season. With Barwell in the 2009–10 season, he struck up a strike partnership with Kevin Charley that saw the pair score more than 50 goals, helping the club win the Midland Football Alliance title and reach the FA Vase semi-final.

Cunnington joined Conference North side Solihull Moors in July 2010, and having scored 10 goals in 22 appearances for the club he signed for Conference National side Kettering Town for an undisclosed fee on 1 February 2011, transfer deadline day. He made his Kettering debut on 26 February, starting the team's 2–0 victory at home over Newport County. He only managed his first Kettering goal in the side's last game of the 2010–11 season, a 3–1 home victory over Southport on 30 April. He finished the season with 14 appearances for Kettering.

Having started the 2011–12 season with five goals in 13 appearances, Cunnington joined League Two club Dagenham & Redbridge on loan on 24 November with a view to a permanent transfer. His debut came two days later after starting a 3–0 defeat away at Accrington Stanley. After making four appearances for Dagenham he permanently moved to the club upon the loan's expiration on 4 January 2012, signing a two-and-a-half-year contract. He joined Conference side Alfreton Town on a one-month loan on 9 March.

For the 2012–13 season, Cunnington signed for Conference outfit Tamworth. He enjoyed a successful season, ending up as the Conference second top-scorer with 21 goals. Cunnington signed for Conference rivals Cambridge United on a two-year contract on 10 May 2013, becoming the club's fifth signing in a week. and was part of the team that won promotion to League Two via the play-offs.

He featured in Cambridge's first three games of the 2014–15 season but the arrival of Jayden Stockley on loan AFC Bournemouth saw him drop down the pecking order and he was loaned out to Conference Premier side Bristol Rovers on 22 August.

After a spell at Ebbsfleet United, and a short loan at Woking, Cunnington signed for Bromley.

Cunnington then spent two years with Billericay Town before signing for Dartford on 2 August 2019. On 8 October 2019, Dartford announced that Cunnington had left the club by mutual consent.

On 9 October 2019, Cunnington joined Hemel Hempstead Town.

On 21 November 2019, Cunnington joined his third team of the 2019/20 season when he linked up with Romford. He left the club in January 2020. and joined Hornchurch.

At the beginning of the 2020/2021 season, Cunnington joined Isthmian Premier League side Cheshunt. He scored his first goals for the club in a 3–1 victory away to Long Melford in an FA Cup First Qualifying Round tie, scoring 2.

On 6 November 2020. Cunnington signed for Cheshunt’s fiercest rivals, Enfield Town.

Career statistics
.

References

External links

1987 births
Living people
People from Leighton Buzzard
English footballers
Association football forwards
Barton Rovers F.C. players
Leighton Town F.C. players
Hitchin Town F.C. players
Rothwell Town F.C. players
Aylesbury United F.C. players
Stamford A.F.C. players
Barwell F.C. players
Solihull Moors F.C. players
Kettering Town F.C. players
Dagenham & Redbridge F.C. players
Alfreton Town F.C. players
Tamworth F.C. players
Cambridge United F.C. players
Bristol Rovers F.C. players
Ebbsfleet United F.C. players
Woking F.C. players
Bromley F.C. players
Billericay Town F.C. players
Dartford F.C. players
Hemel Hempstead Town F.C. players
Romford F.C. players
Hornchurch F.C. players
Cheshunt F.C. players
Enfield Town F.C. players
English Football League players
National League (English football) players
Southern Football League players
Isthmian League players
Footballers from Bedfordshire